Apkar Vania Apkarian is a professor of physiology, anesthesiology, and physical medicine and rehabilitation at Northwestern University in the Feinberg School of Medicine. He has been a pioneer in the use of Magnetic resonance spectroscopy to study the neurochemistry of the brain and the development of novel analytical approaches to studying consciousness, including the first demonstration of the brain's small-world network properties using fMRI. In 2008, Dr. Apkarian proposed the theory that chronic pain is a form of emotional learning, which popularized the study of reward learning within the pain research field. Dr. Apkarian earned a master's degree in electrical engineering from the University of Southern California and earned a Ph.D. in neuroscience from the State University of New York Upstate Medical University  in Syracuse, New York. He is the brother of Vartkess A. Apkarian, a noted chemical physicist and laser spectroscopist at University of California at Irvine.

Dr. Apkarian's early work with primate electrophysiology established that thalamic neurons can be physiologically characterized based on morphology and projections to the cortex, which led to the discovery that the thalamus dynamically encodes nociceptive stimuli in response to features of sensory stimuli. In the 1990s, his research transitioned to human brain imaging-based investigations of pain qualia and neural mechanisms underlying chronic pain. Dr. Apkarian's body of research was pivotal in establishing neuroplasticity as a mechanism of chronic pain, with notable findings including: in 2004 his group first identified grey matter changes related to chronic back pain, in 2008 his group first described resting state network changes in chronic pain patients and white matter abnormalities related to complex regional pain syndrome, and in 2012 his group published the first evidence that functional connectivity between the medial prefrontal cortex and nucleus accumbens prospectively predicts the development of chronic back pain. Much of this work was done in collaboration with Marwan Baliki, a research scientist at the Shirley Ryan Ability Lab (formerly Rehabilitation Institute of Chicago), and Paul Geha, an Assistant Professor of Psychiatry at Yale School of Medicine.In 2013, he published a seminal finding looking at longitudinal changes in the brain as back pain persists for 6 months to over an year. This study shows that the brain representations for subacute back pain look like those for evoked acute pain, but when the back pain persists for over a year and becomes chronic, then the representations shift to regions involved in self-referential fear processing (Hashmi et al., 2013, Brain).  

Dr. Apkarian's research has increasingly focused on the translation of neuroimaging findings to improve clinical treatment of chronic pain, include the development of preventative treatments and the strategic use of placebo treatment.  This work should hopefully traverse through the alleviation of clinical pain conditions, as well as a more exact theoretical and mechanistic understanding of the brain.

Criticisms of Dr. Apkarian's work include his focus on chronic low back pain, low rates of depression in his clinical cohorts, and emphasis on cortical mechanisms of chronic pain. Nevertheless, his use of rigorous statistical analyses, validation of findings in independent cohorts, replication of findings using multiple imaging modalities, use of longitudinal neuroimaging, and replication of key fMRI findings in rodent models of neuropathic pain have created a consistent body of research.

Chronic pain
Chronic pain is one of the biggest health problems in the world. In United States chronic pain costs the United States about $100 billion a year.  As per Technology Review magazine:

"A. Vania Apkarian and his colleagues at Northwestern University have found a series of abnormalities in the brains of chronic pain sufferers: the part of the prefrontal cortex linked to decision making appears to have shrunk in chronic pain patients. And another part of the prefrontal cortex linked to emotion is hyperactive. In fact, a unique study assessing background pain in chronic back-pain patients suggests that the constant pain these people experience is linked to activity almost entirely in emotion-regulating parts of the brain."

According to Dr Vania Apkarian it is important to treat pain early to prevent any permanent changes or damages to the nervous system.

Selected media coverage
Washington Post June 21, 2007
"'Memory Traces' May Help Spur Chronic Pain"

NY Times November 23, 2004
"Patterns: Pain and the Downsized Brain"

BBC November 23, 2004
"Pain link to permanent brain loss "

NY Times August 10, 1999
"Peering into the Brain To See Pain at Work"

Medical News: Pain Management February 6, 2008
"Chronic Pain Disrupts Resting Brain Dynamics"

Technology Review November 11, 2007
"The Brain in Chronic Pain"

Chicago Tribune July 3, 2007
"Sometimes physical pain can be traced to memory"

LA Times November 29, 2004
"Back pain linked to premature aging"

New Scientist November 27, 2004
"Does Back Pain Shrink Your Brain?"

Wissenchaft November 26, 2004
"Dauerhafte Rückenschmerzen lassen das Gehirn schrumpfen"

References

Apkarian CV

American neuroscientists
Year of birth missing (living people)
USC Viterbi School of Engineering alumni
State University of New York Upstate Medical University alumni
Northwestern University faculty
Living people
Place of birth missing (living people)